The Siculensi were an ancient people of Sardinia, noted by Ptolemy (III, 3).  They dwelt south of the Celsitani and the Corpicenses and north of the Neapolitani and the Valentini.

References
Ptolemy's Geography online

Ancient peoples of Sardinia